Capital Centre is a major mixed-use development currently under construction in Abu Dhabi.

The development is taking place around the Abu Dhabi National Exhibition Centre and consists of residential, commercial and hotel accommodation spread over 23 towers.  The development is supplemented by the exhibition centre, Aloft Abu Dhabi Hotel and Capital Gate Tower.

Capital Centre is being developed on an  area of land which was previously occupied by Abu Dhabi's old exhibition facilities and car parks.

Capital Centre is one of the largest developments on the main island of Abu Dhabi.

References

Buildings and structures under construction in Abu Dhabi